Agia Eirini (for Saint Irene) may refer to several places in Cyprus and Greece:

In Cyprus 
 Agia Eirini, Kyrenia
 Agia Eirini, Nicosia

In Greece 
 Agia Eirini Gorge, in Chania, Crete
 Agia Eirini, Chania, a village in Chania, Crete
 Agia Eirini, Cephalonia, on the island of Cephalonia
 Agia Eirini, Paros, on the island of Paros
 Agia Eirini, Kea, a prehistoric settlement on Kea Island
 Agia Eirini (island), an uninhabited islet south of Crete

See also 
 Hagia Irene, an ancient Byzantine church in Istanbul